Jean Monet (August 8, 1867 – February 10, 1914) was the eldest son of French Impressionist artist Claude Monet and Camille Doncieux Monet and the brother of Michel Monet. He was the subject of several paintings by his father and married his step-sister, Blanche Hoschedé.

Early life
Jean Monet was born to Camille Doncieux and Claude Monet on August 8, 1867. During that summer Claude Monet was staying at his father's house in Sainte-Adresse, a suburb of Le Havre. Monet went to Paris for the birth of Jean and returned to Sainte-Adresse on the 12th of the month.

The first portrait that Monet made of his son was of the four-month-old Jean Monet in His Cradle. Alongside Jean was a woman Julie Vellay, a companion of  Camille Pissarro, rather than his mother. According to Mary Mathews Gedo, author of Monet and his Muse: Camile Monet in the Artist's Life: 
The identification of Jean's attendant as someone other than his mother seems entirely consistent with what would prove to be Monet's future insistence on depicting Camille as 'unmother'. Mother and son were only shown in the same physical space in one painting during the Argenteuil years by Monet, The Luncheon.

In 1868, after having left Paris to escape creditors and find more affordable housing, the three moved to Gloton, a small scenic village near Bennecourt. They were thrown out of the inn they were staying in for non-payment. Camille and Jean were able to stay with someone in the country, while Monet tried to obtain monies for survival. However, without money for a medical treatment, Jean became quite ill. After a dramatic period experienced by Camille and Jean, Claude was able to obtain funds for housing for his family in Le Havre.

His parents were married on June 28, 1870.

When Jean was a young child his mother and father had fled France during the Franco-Prussian War. They returned by the summer of 1872 when Claude painted his five-year-old son on a hobby horse in the garden of the home the family rented in Argenteuil near Paris. Claude Monet kept the painting, and never exhibited it, throughout his life.

Education
He trained to be a chemist in Switzerland.

Marriage
Monet married his step-sister, the painter Blanche Hoschedé, in 1897.  They lived in Rouen, where Jean worked for his uncle Léon Monet as a chemist, and Beaumont-le-Roger until 1913.

The couple visited Giverny on weekends.

Death
Jean suffered an illness for a period of time and died on February 10, 1914. He is buried at the Giverny Church Cemetery, Giverny. His wife Blanche, father, and brother Michel are also buried at the cemetery.

Paintings by his father
Paintings by Claude Monet of his son:
 Jean Monet in His Cradle
 Jean Monet Sleeping, 1867-1868
 Child with a Cup: Portrait of Jean Monet, 1868
 The Luncheon, 1868-1869
 Portrait of Jean Monet Wearing a Hat with a Pompom, 1870
 Jean Monet on his Hobby Horse, 1872
 Camille and Jean Monet in the Garden at Argenteuil , 1873
 Camille in the Garden with Jean and His Nurse, 1873
 Jean in the artist's house, 1875
 Woman with a Parasol - Madame Monet and Her Son, 1875
 Jean Monet, 1880

Gallery

Paintings by Claude Monet

Paintings by other artists

Notes

References

1867 births
1913 deaths
Claude Monet
19th-century French people